Alternating may refer to:

Mathematics 
 Alternating algebra, an algebra in which odd-grade elements square to zero
 Alternating form, a function formula in algebra
 Alternating group, the group of even permutations of a finite set
 Alternating knot, a knot or link diagram for which the crossings alternate under, over, under, over, as one travels along each component of the link
 Alternating map, a multilinear map that is zero whenever any two of its arguments are equal
 Alternating operator, a multilinear map in algebra
 Alternating permutation, a type of permutation studied in combinatorics
 Alternating series, an infinite series in which the signs of the general terms alternate between positive and negative

Electronics 
 Alternating current, a flow of electric charge that periodically reverses direction

Other 
 Alternating turns, the process by which people in a conversation decide who is to speak next

See also 
 Alternate bass
 Alternative (disambiguation)